The 2006 South Dakota gubernatorial election was held on November 7, 2006. Incumbent Republican Governor Mike Rounds defeated Democrat Jack Billion to serve a second term as governor.

Democratic Primary

Candidates
 Jack Billion, former South Dakota State Representative
 Dennis Weise, president of the South Dakota Farmers Union

Results

Republican Primary

Candidates
 Mike Rounds, incumbent Governor of South Dakota

Results
Governor Rounds faced no opposition in the Republican primary.

Minor parties

Libertarian Party
 Tom Gerber

Constitution Party
 Steven J. Willis, small business owner, Navy veteran, conservative activist

General election

Predictions

Election results

See also
 U.S. gubernatorial elections, 2006

References

External links
Official campaign sites (Archived)
 Jack Billion Campaign Site
 Mike Rounds Campaign Site
 Steven J. Willis Campaign Site

Gubernatorial
2006
South Dakota